Alistra is a genus of dwarf sheet spiders that was first described by Tamerlan Thorell in 1894.

Species
 it contains twenty-one species:
Alistra annulata Zhang, Li & Zheng, 2011 – China
Alistra astrolomae (Hickman, 1948) – Australia (Tasmania)
Alistra berlandi (Marples, 1955) – Samoa
Alistra centralis (Forster, 1970) – New Zealand
Alistra hamata Zhang, Li & Pham, 2013 – Vietnam
Alistra hippocampa Zhang, Li & Zheng, 2011 – China
Alistra inanga (Forster, 1970) – New Zealand
Alistra longicauda Thorell, 1894 (type) – Indonesia (Sumatra)
Alistra mangareia (Forster, 1970) – New Zealand
Alistra mendanai Brignoli, 1986 – Solomon Is., Réunion
Alistra myops (Simon, 1898) – Philippines
Alistra napua (Forster, 1970) – New Zealand
Alistra opina (Forster, 1970) – New Zealand
Alistra personata Ledoux, 2004 – Réunion
Alistra pusilla (Rainbow, 1920) – Australia (Lord Howe Is.)
Alistra radleyi (Simon, 1898) – Sri Lanka
Alistra reinga (Forster, 1970) – New Zealand
Alistra stenura (Simon, 1898) – Sri Lanka
Alistra sulawesensis Bosmans, 1992 – Indonesia (Sulawesi)
Alistra taprobanica (Simon, 1898) – Sri Lanka
Alistra tuna (Forster, 1970) – New Zealand

References

Araneomorphae genera
Hahniidae
Spiders of Asia
Spiders of Australia
Spiders of New Zealand
Taxa named by Tamerlan Thorell